Malaysia has 169 cinemas operating throughout the country. The only states without cinemas are Perlis and Kelantan. The largest cinema operator is Golden Screen Cinemas. There are other large operators such as TGV Cinemas, MBO Cinemas, Lotus Five Star, DADI Cinema and mmCineplexes. Other than these operators, some smaller operators do screening on a small scale.

History
The first cinema in Malaysia was the Coliseum Theatre in Kuala Lumpur in 1928. However, it ceased operations in 2010 and was transformed into a cultural centre. In 2012, Lotus Five Star reopened the cinema with two digital halls. The first multiplex with a computerised ticketing system in Malaysia is Golden Screen Cinemas in Leisure Mall in Cheras. It has four screens and 1356 seats. The first IMAX theatre in the country was located in Berjaya Times Square which hosts one screen and has 555 seats.  Operations were ceased in 2010, and GSC MAXX now occupies it. As of 2013, all screens were made digital regardless of the type of movies played.

Overview
The largest cinema in Malaysia is at Mid Valley Megamall. This outlet has 21 screens and 2763 seats. The cinema with the most number of seats is located in City Square, with 2776 seats. In contrast, the cinema with the most digital halls is in Era Square Mall, Seremban and GSC CityONE Megamall, Kuching with all ten screens being digital. The largest digital hall in Malaysia is the GSC MAXX at Berjaya Times Square which has 555 seats. Sunway Pyramid, 1 Utama, AEON Tebrau City, Gurney Paragon Mall and VivaCity Megamall host five IMAX theatres in the country, and a new IMAX hall will be opened in Kota Kinabalu. 4D theatres are located in First World Plaza in Resort World Genting, A' Famosa Resort in Malacca and Legoland Malaysia in Iskandar Puteri. There are 5D theatres in I-City, 1st Avenue Mall in Penang, and Plaza Merdeka, Kuching, whereas Sunway Lagoon hosts the world's first 5D water-based ride, known as Waterplexx 5D. A 6D theatre in the country is located in KL Tower and Seremban Prima Mall, with a new one opening in Langkawi. In 2013, TGV Cinemas fully converted all of their screens across the nation into digital, followed by MBO Cinemas and GSC Cinemas.

Cinemas

Johor
 Number of cinemas: 30
 Largest cinema: Golden Screen Cinemas The Mall, Mid Valley Southkey, Johor Bahru (18 screens and 1,646 seats)
 Largest cinema operator: Golden Screen Cinemas - 8 outlets (80 screens and 10,488 seats)
 Total number of screens: 208
 Total number of seats: 29,084

Kedah
 Number of cinemas: 9
 Largest cinema: GSC Aman Central (10 screens and 1,599 seats)
 Largest cinema operator: Golden Screen Cinemas - 4 outlets (32 screens and 5,172 seats)
 Total number of screens: 58
 Total number of seats: 8,995

Kuala Lumpur
 Number of cinemas: 24 
 Largest cinema: GSC Midvalley Megamall (21 screens and 2,763 seats)
 Largest cinema operator: Golden Screen Cinemas - 10 outlets (98 screens and 14,401 seats)
 Total number of screens: 214
 Total number of seats: 35,079

Labuan
 Number of cinemas: 1
 Largest cinema: Perdana Cineplex (2 screen and 180 seats)
 Largest cinema operator: Perdana Cineplex - 1 outlet (2 screens and 180 seats)
 Total number of screens: 2
 Total number of seats: 180

Malacca
 Number of cinemas: 7
 Largest cinema: Golden Screen Cinemas Dataran Pahlawan (10 screens and 2,004 seats)
 Largest cinema operator: Golden Screen Cinemas - 3 outlets (28 screens and 4,987 Seats)
 Total number of screens: 57
 Total number of seats: 10,222

Negeri Sembilan
 Number of cinemas: 7
 Largest cinema: GSC Palm Mall (10 screens and 1,659 seats)
 Largest cinema operator: Golden Screen Cinemas - 2 outlets (14 screens and 2,669 Seats)
 Total number of screens: 46
 Total number of seats: 7712

Pahang
 Number of cinemas: 5
 Largest cinema: GSC East Coast Mall (9 screens and 1,633 seats)
 Largest cinema operator: Golden Screen Cinemas - 3 outlets (24 screens and 4,070 seats)
 Total number of screens: 33
 Total number of seats: 5,698

Penang
 Number of cinemas: 11
 Largest cinema: GSC Gurney Plaza (12 screens and 1,610 seats)
 Largest cinemas operator: Golden Screen Cinemas - 3 outlets (28 screens and 4,236 seats)
 Total number of screens: 80
 Total number of seats: 13,434

Perak
 Number of cinemas: 17
 Largest cinema: GSC Ipoh Parade (11 screens with 1,926 seats)
 Largest cinema operator: TGV Cinemas - 4 outlets (35 screens and 6,373 seats)
 Total number of screens: 104
 Total number of seats: 17,747

Putrajaya
 Number of cinemas: 2
 Largest cinema: GSC IOI City Mall (13 screens and 2,133 seats)
 Largest cinema operator: Golden Screen Cinemas - 2 outlets (21 screens and 3,537 seats)
 Total number of screens: 21
 Total number of seats: 3,537

Sabah
 Number of cinemas: 13
 Largest cinema: Growball Cinemax Centre Point KK (9 screens and 1,745 seats)
 Largest cinema operator: Golden Screen Cinemas - 3 outlets (24 screens and 4,058 seats)
 Total number of screens: 79
 Total number of seats: 8,662

Sarawak
 Number of Cinemas: 10
 Largest Cinema: mmCineplexes Summer Mall (12 screens and 2,038 seats)
 Largest Cinemas Operator: Golden Screen Cinemas - 4 outlets (35 screens and 5,554 seats) 
 Total number of screens: 82
 Total number of seats: 12,769

Selangor

 Number of cinemas: 37
 Largest cinema: mmCineplexes e@Curve (18 screens and 2,836 seats)
 Largest cinema operator: TGV Cinemas - 12 outlets (104 screens and 16,695 seats)
 Total number of screens: 296
 Total number of seats: 47,327

Terengganu
 Number of cinemas: 3
 Largest cinema: LFS Paya Bunga Sentral (11 Screens and 1,631 seats)
 Largest cinema operator: Lotus Five Star - 1 outlet (11 screens and 1,631 seats)
 Total number of screens: 16
 Total number of seats: 2,413

Cinema statistics

Cinema with the most number of halls

Cinema with the most number of seats

See also
 List of films released in Malaysia

References

External links
 List of cinema in Malaysia on Cinema Online

 
Malaysia
Lists of tourist attractions in Malaysia
Malaysian film-related lists
Lists of buildings and structures in Malaysia